David Taylor (14 March 1954 – 24 June 2014) was a General Secretary of UEFA and Chief Executive of the Scottish Football Association.

Born in Forfar, Scotland in 1954, he was educated at the High School of Dundee before graduating from the University of Edinburgh with a degree in law. He qualified as a solicitor and practised law until 1985, during which time he added to his legal qualifications with an MSc in Economics and an MBA.

Taylor was appointed to General Secretary of UEFA on 1 June 2007, after the UEFA extraordinary congress in Zürich on 29 May 2007 voted to replace the role of Chief Executive with that of General Secretary. He held this position until October 2009, when he moved to a marketing position within UEFA. He was previously the Chief Executive of the Scottish Football Association (SFA).

He died at the age of 60 on 24 June 2014.

References

1954 births
2014 deaths
Alumni of the University of Edinburgh
Chief executives of the Scottish Football Association
UEFA officials
People educated at the High School of Dundee
People from Forfar
Scottish lawyers
20th-century Scottish businesspeople